The men's 50 metre rifle three positions competition at the 2002 Asian Games in Busan, South Korea was held on 7 October at the Changwon International Shooting Range.

The men's 50 metre rifle three positions consists of the prone, standing and kneeling positions, fired in that order, with 3×40 shots for men.

The men's match has separate commands and times for each position, giving each shooter 45 minutes to complete the prone part, 75 minutes for the standing part, and 60 minutes for the kneeling part, including sighting shots for each part.

The top eight competitors reach the final, where the score zones are divided into tenths, giving up to 10.9 points for each shot. The men's final consists of ten shots from the standing position, with a time limit of 75 seconds per shot. The competition is won by the shooter who reaches the highest aggregate score (qualification + final, maximum 1309.0).

Schedule
All times are Korea Standard Time (UTC+09:00)

Records

Results

Qualification

Final

References 

2002 Asian Games Report, Page 606–610
Qualification Results
Final Results

External links
Official website

Men Rifle 50 3P